Marc Ravelonantoandro is a Malagasy Roman Catholic priest and academic. He has been Rector of the Catholic University of Madagascar since 2013.

Biography 
Ravelonantoandro was ordained to the priesthood in 1992.

Since 2013, he has been Rector at the Catholic University of Madagascar. Under his tenure, the university established a doctoral school and a psychology department. In 2017, he earned a doctorate from the University of Toamasina. He completed his studies for a diplôme d'habilitation à diriger des recherches (HDR) (Diploma of Authorization to Direct Research), and his thesis was entitled "Anthropological and Theological Insights of the Human of Fihavanana in the Image of God".

Bibliography

See also 
 List of Catholic priests

References 

20th-century Malagasy people
20th-century Roman Catholic priests
21st-century Malagasy people
21st-century Roman Catholic priests
Malagasy academic administrators
Catholic University of Madagascar
Living people
Malagasy Roman Catholic priests
University of Toamasina alumni
Year of birth missing (living people)